The Ministry of Development was a government ministry in the Republic of Turkey that was formed on 29 June 2011 after the dissolution of the State Planning Organisation. The Ministry was led by Minister of Development Cevdet Yılmaz, of the Justice and Development Party (AKP), formally taking office on 6 July 2011 after the formation of Prime Minister Recep Tayyip Erdoğan's third cabinet. He was succeeded by Müslüm Doğan in August 2015, who resigned in September 2015 and was succeeded by Cüneyd Düzyol. Yılmaz took over the Ministry for a second time from November 2015 to May 2016 before being succeeded by Lütfi Elvan.

The Ministry describes itself as a dynamic Ministry with expertise, focusing on leading the development of Turkey in a holistic manner by strategy making and co-ordinating.

List of Ministers of Development

References

External links
Website
https://twitter.com/kalkinma
Regional Development Agencies established by the Ministry in Turkey

Ministries established in 2011
2011 establishments in Turkey
Defunct government ministries of Turkey